The Optional Protocol on the Sale of Children, Child Prostitution and Child Pornography is a protocol to the Convention on the Rights of the Child and requires parties to prohibit the sale of children, child prostitution and child pornography.

The Protocol was adopted by the United Nations General Assembly in 2000 and entered into force on 18 January 2002. As of October 2022, 178 states are party to the protocol. 

According to the preamble, the protocol is intended to achieve the purposes of certain articles in the Convention on the Rights of the Child, where the rights are defined with the provision that parties should take "appropriate measures" to protect them. Article 1 of the protocol requires parties to protect the rights and interests of child victims of trafficking, child prostitution and child pornography, child labour and especially the worst forms of child labour.

The remaining articles in the protocol outline the standards for international law enforcement covering diverse issues such as jurisdictional factors, extradition, mutual assistance in investigations, criminal or extradition proceedings and seizure and confiscation of assets as well.

It also obliges parties to pass laws within their own territories against these practices "punishable by appropriate penalties that take into account their grave nature."

Definitions
The Protocol requires parties to prohibit the sale of children, child prostitution and child pornography. Article 2 defines the prohibition:
Sale of children –  Any act or transaction whereby a child is transferred by any person or group of persons to another for remuneration or any other consideration.
Child prostitution – Use of a child in sexual activities for remuneration or any other form of consideration.
Child pornography – Any representation, by whatever means, of a child engaged in real or simulated explicit sexual activities or any representation of the sexual parts of a child for primarily sexual purposes.

The Convention generally defines a child as any human being under the age of 18, unless an earlier age of majority is recognized by a country's law.

Parties and reservations
List of countries that are parties to the protocol :

Afghanistan; Albania; Algeria; Andorra; Angola; Antigua and Barbuda; Argentina; Armenia; Australia; Austria; Azerbaijan; Bahamas; Bahrain; Bangladesh; Belarus; Belgium; Belize; Benin; Bhutan; Bolivia; Bosnia and Herzegovina; Botswana; Brazil; Brunei Darussalam; Bulgaria; Burkina Faso; Burundi; Cabo Verde; Cambodia; Cameroon; Canada; Central African Republic; Chad; Chile; China; Colombia; Comoros; Congo; Costa Rica; Côte d'Ivoire; Croatia; Cuba; Cyprus; Czech Republic; Democratic People's Republic of Korea; Democratic Republic of the Congo; Denmark; Djibouti; Dominica; Dominican Republic; Ecuador; Egypt; El Salvador; Equatorial Guinea; Eritrea; Estonia; Eswatini; Ethiopia; Fiji; Finland; France; Gabon; Gambia; Georgia; Germany; Ghana; Greece; Grenada; Guatemala; Guinea; Guinea-Bissau; Guyana; Haiti; Holy See; Honduras; Hungary; Iceland; India; Indonesia; Iran; Iraq; Israel; Italy; Jamaica; Japan; Jordan; Kazakhstan; Kenya; Kiribati; Kuwait; Kyrgyzstan; Lao People's Democratic Republic; Latvia; Lebanon; Lesotho; Liberia; Libya; Liechtenstein; Lithuania; Luxembourg; Madagascar; Malawi; Malaysia; Maldives; Mali; Malta; Marshall Islands; Mauritania; Mauritius; Mexico; Micronesia (Federated States of); Monaco; Mongolia; Montenegro; Morocco; Mozambique; Myanmar; Namibia; Nauru; Nepal; Netherlands; New Zealand; Nicaragua; Niger; Nigeria; North Macedonia; Norway; Oman; Pakistan; Panama; Paraguay; Peru; Philippines; Poland; Portugal; Qatar; Republic of Ireland; Republic of Korea; Republic of Moldova; Romania; Russian Federation; Rwanda; Samoa; San Marino; Saudi Arabia; Senegal; Serbia; Seychelles; Sierra Leone; Slovakia; Slovenia; Solomon Islands; South Africa; South Sudan; Spain; Sri Lanka; St. Lucia; St. Vincent and the Grenadines; State of Palestine; Sudan; Suriname; Sweden; Switzerland; Syrian Arab Republic; Tajikistan; Thailand; Timor-Leste; Togo; Tunisia; Turkey; Turkmenistan; Uganda; Ukraine; United Arab Emirates; United Kingdom of Great Britain and Northern Ireland; United Republic of Tanzania; United States of America; Uruguay; Uzbekistan; Vanuatu; Venezuela; Viet Nam; Yemen; Zambia; Zimbabwe

Reservations and territorial application

China
In China's ratification, the Hong Kong Special Administrative Region was excluded, but the Macao Special Administrative Region was included.

Denmark
On ratification on 24 July 2003, Denmark excluded the territories of the Faroe Islands and Greenland. This exclusion was withdrawn on 10 October 2016.

Netherlands
Initially the ratification only applied to the European part of the Netherlands. On 17 October 2006, it was extended to Aruba, on 10 October 2010, to the Caribbean part of the Netherlands (Bonaire, Sint Eustatius and Saba) and on 20 September 2022 to Curaçao. The convention does not apply to Sint Maarten.

New Zealand
New Zealand's ratification excluded the islands of Tokelau.

Qatar
Qatar added in its signing statement that it was "subject to a general reservation regarding any provisions in the protocol that are in conflict with the Islamic Shariah." Objections to this reservation were registered in the signing statements by Austria, France, Germany, Norway, Spain and Sweden. Qatar withdrew the reservation on 18 June 2008, and currently has no reservations to the Protocol.

United Kingdom
The United Kingdom's original ratification was only applicable to the UK and not the Crown dependencies or dependent territories. On 29 April 2014, the Bailiwick of Jersey and on 4 November 2020, Guernsey and Alderney were included.

Vietnam
On ratification, Vietnam included reservations regarding article 5 (1), (2), (3), and (4) of the protocol (which relate to the extradition of those who have offended under the protocol). The reservation were withdrawn on 26 March 2009.

Definitions of child pornography
Belgium and the US have defined child pornography in regards to the protocol as "visual representation of a child engaged in real or simulated sexual activities or of the genitalia of a child where the dominant characteristic is depiction for a sexual purpose".

Denmark and Malaysia's definition in their protocol declarations is "any visual representation". 

Sweden has clarified its interpretation of child pornography as applying only to the visual representation of sexual acts with a minor, and not applying to adults acting, posing, or dressing, as a minor.

See also
 Council of Europe Convention on the Protection of Children against Sexual Exploitation and Sexual Abuse
 Special Rapporteur on the sale of children, child prostitution and child pornography

References

External links
 Optional Protocol on the Sale of Children, Child Prostitution and Child Pornography (full text)

Child pornography law
Obscenity treaties
Treaties extended to Jersey
Optional Protocol on the Sale of Children
Optional Protocol on the Sale of Children, Child Prostitution and Child Pornography
United Nations treaties
Treaties concluded in 2000
Child labour treaties
Treaties entered into force in 2002
Optional Protocol on the Sale of Children, Child Prostitution and Child Pornography
Treaties of the Afghan Transitional Administration
Treaties of Albania
Treaties of Algeria
Treaties of Andorra
Treaties of Angola
Treaties of Argentina
Treaties of Armenia
Treaties of Australia
Treaties of Austria
Treaties of Azerbaijan
Treaties of the Bahamas
Treaties of Bahrain
Treaties of Bangladesh
Treaties of Belarus
Treaties of Belgium
Treaties of Belize
Treaties of Benin
Treaties of Bhutan
Treaties of Bolivia
Treaties of Bosnia and Herzegovina
Treaties of Botswana
Treaties of Brazil
Treaties of Bulgaria
Treaties of Burkina Faso
Treaties of Burundi
Treaties of Cambodia
Treaties of Canada
Treaties of Cape Verde
Treaties of Chad
Treaties of Chile
Treaties of the People's Republic of China
Treaties of Colombia
Treaties of the Republic of the Congo
Treaties of Costa Rica
Treaties of Ivory Coast
Treaties of Croatia
Treaties of Cuba
Treaties of Cyprus
Treaties of the Czech Republic
Treaties of the Democratic Republic of the Congo
Treaties of Denmark
Treaties of Djibouti
Treaties of Dominica
Treaties of Ecuador
Treaties of Egypt
Treaties of El Salvador
Treaties of Eritrea
Treaties of Ethiopia
Treaties of Fiji
Treaties of Finland
Treaties of France
Treaties of Gabon
Treaties of Georgia (country)
Treaties of Germany
Treaties of Greece
Treaties of Grenada
Treaties of Guatemala
Treaties of Guyana
Treaties of Haiti
Treaties of the Holy See
Treaties of Honduras
Treaties of Hungary
Treaties of Iceland
Treaties of India
Treaties of Indonesia
Treaties of Iraq
Treaties of Israel
Treaties of Italy
Treaties of Jamaica
Treaties of Japan
Treaties of Jordan
Treaties of Kazakhstan
Treaties of Kiribati
Treaties of Kuwait
Treaties of Kyrgyzstan
Treaties of Laos
Treaties of Latvia
Treaties of Lesotho
Treaties of the Libyan Arab Jamahiriya
Treaties of Liechtenstein
Treaties of Lithuania
Treaties of Luxembourg
Treaties of Madagascar
Treaties of Malawi
Treaties of Malaysia
Treaties of the Maldives
Treaties of Mali
Treaties of Malta
Treaties of Mauritius
Treaties of Mexico
Treaties of Monaco
Treaties of Mongolia
Treaties of Montenegro
Treaties of Morocco
Treaties of Mozambique
Treaties of Namibia
Treaties of Nepal
Treaties of the Netherlands
Treaties of Nicaragua
Treaties of New Zealand
Treaties of Niger
Treaties of Nigeria
Treaties of North Korea
Treaties of Norway
Treaties of Oman
Treaties of the State of Palestine
Treaties of Panama
Treaties of Paraguay
Treaties of Peru
Treaties of the Philippines
Treaties of Poland
Treaties of Portugal
Treaties of Qatar
Treaties of South Korea
Treaties of South Sudan
Treaties of Moldova
Treaties of Romania
Treaties of Russia
Treaties of Rwanda
Treaties of Saint Lucia
Treaties of Samoa
Treaties of San Marino
Treaties of Saudi Arabia
Treaties of Senegal
Treaties of Serbia and Montenegro
Treaties of Seychelles
Treaties of Sierra Leone
Treaties of Singapore
Treaties of Slovakia
Treaties of Slovenia
Treaties of the Solomon Islands
Treaties of South Africa
Treaties of Spain
Treaties of Sri Lanka
Treaties of Saint Vincent and the Grenadines
Treaties of the Republic of the Sudan (1985–2011)
Treaties of Eswatini
Treaties of Sweden
Treaties of Switzerland
Treaties of Syria
Treaties of Tajikistan
Treaties of Thailand
Treaties of North Macedonia
Treaties of East Timor
Treaties of Togo
Treaties of Tunisia
Treaties of Turkey
Treaties of Turkmenistan
Treaties of Uganda
Treaties of Ukraine
Treaties of the United Kingdom
Treaties of Tanzania
Treaties of the United Arab Emirates
Treaties of the United States
Treaties of Uruguay
Treaties of Uzbekistan
Treaties of Vanuatu
Treaties of Venezuela
Treaties of Vietnam
Treaties of Yemen
Treaties of Brunei
Treaties of the Central African Republic
Treaties of the Comoros
Treaties of the Dominican Republic
Treaties of Equatorial Guinea
Treaties of the Gambia
Treaties of Guinea
Treaties of Guinea-Bissau
Treaties of Iran
Treaties of Lebanon
Treaties of Mauritania
Treaties of the Federated States of Micronesia
Treaties of Myanmar
Treaties of Pakistan
Treaties of Suriname
Treaties of Zimbabwe
Treaties of Antigua and Barbuda
2000 in New York City
Treaties adopted by United Nations General Assembly resolutions
Treaties extended to Aruba
Treaties extended to Curaçao
Treaties extended to Macau
Treaties extended to the Caribbean Netherlands